Protandrena bachue is the type species of mining bee in the subgenus Andinopanurgus of genus Protandrena, first described by Victor H. González and Luisa Ruz in 2007.

Etymology and habitat 
The genus name is named after the Andes, referring to the Andean distribution of this group of bees. The species epithet is named after the Muisca goddess Bachué. The Muisca people inhabited the area where the species has been found; Cundinamarca and Boyacá.

Description 
The body is predominantly dark brown to black with reduced yellow maculations; forewing with two submarginal cells. 
The females are small to moderate-sized bees (4–12 mm in length). Males are longer than the females and have sparser body pubescence.

Other species in this subgenus 
 Protandrena amyae 
 Protandrena femoralis
 Protandrena guarnensis
 Protandrena maximina
 Protandrena rangeli
 Protandrena wayruronga

References 

Andrenidae
Endemic fauna of Colombia
Arthropods of Colombia
Altiplano Cundiboyacense
Bachue
Insects described in 2007